British royal residences are palaces, castles and houses occupied by members of the British royal family in the United Kingdom. Some, like Buckingham Palace and Windsor Castle, are owned by the Crown (ownership by the British monarch is by virtue of his or her position as king or queen), while others like Balmoral Castle and Sandringham House are personally owned and have been passed down for generations. Some royal palaces, such as the Palace of Westminster (now used as the House of Parliament), are no longer residences. Some remain in irregular use for royal occasions, such as Hillsborough Castle in Northern Ireland. 

The royal palaces enjoy certain legal privileges known as royal prerogatives: for example, there is an exemption from levying duty on alcoholic beverages sold in the bars at the Palace of Westminster and there are exemptions from health and safety legislation. According to Halsbury's Laws of England, it is not possible to arrest a person within the "verges" of a royal palace (though this assertion is contradicted by a memorandum by the Clerk of the House of Commons in respect of the Palace of Westminster) and, when a royal palace is used as a residence (regardless of whether the monarch is actually living there at the time), judicial processes cannot be executed within that palace.

The occupied royal residences are cared for and maintained by the Property Section of the Royal Households of the United Kingdom. The unoccupied royal palaces of England, along with Hillsborough Castle, are the responsibility of Historic Royal Palaces.

Unlike the other nations of the United Kingdom, there is no official residence for a member of the royal family in Wales; Llwynywermod is the private Welsh residence of the Prince of Wales.

Current royal residences 
Residences in London

Residences in or near Windsor

Other residences

Former royal residences

See also

 Pickering Castle

References

External links
Art and residences at the royal family website

Royal residences
Royal
British
British